Albert Richard Dorow (November 15, 1929 – December 7, 2009) was an American gridiron football quarterback.  He played college football at Michigan State University and professionally in the National Football League (NFL), the American Football League (AFL), and the Canadian Football League (CFL).

Life and career
Dorow, a quarterback, played college football at Michigan State University and was All-American in 1951. He was drafted in the third round of the 1952 NFL Draft. After serving the required two years in the military, Dorow played for the Washington Redskins during the 1954, 1955, and 1956 seasons, and for the Philadelphia Eagles in 1957.   After being released by the Eagles before the start of the 1958 season, Dorow spent two years in the Canadian Football League, playing for Saskatchewan, British Columbia, and Toronto.  Dorow moved to the AFL for its inaugural season, playing for the New York Titans (forerunner of the New York Jets) in 1960 and 1961, before being traded to the Buffalo Bills for the 1962 season.  Dorow injured his arm in the fourth game of the 1962 season and was unable to play again.

Dorow's awards include All American in football for MSU in 1951. Dorow's other accomplishments include leading the AFL in most touchdowns thrown (26) in 1960.  Dorow also co-holds the CFL single-game record for sacks with 7, matched by two others.

After leaving professional football, Dorow was a backfield coach for Hillsdale College in Michigan for the 1963 and 1964 seasons.  He then became an assistant to Duffy Daugherty at Michigan State for the 1965 through 1970 seasons.  He was the head coach of the Hamilton Tiger-Cats in 1971 and part of the 1972 season.

After football, Dorow worked as a salesman and manager, retiring in 1989.

Dorow died of bone cancer on December 7, 2009.

See also
 List of American Football League players

References

1929 births
2009 deaths
American football quarterbacks
American players of Canadian football
Canadian football quarterbacks
BC Lions players
Buffalo Bills players
Hamilton Tiger-Cats coaches
Hillsdale Chargers football coaches
Michigan State Spartans football coaches
Michigan State Spartans football players
New York Titans (AFL) players
Philadelphia Eagles players
Washington Redskins players
American Football League All-Star players
Eastern Conference Pro Bowl players
People from Imlay City, Michigan
Sportspeople from Metro Detroit
Players of American football from Michigan
Deaths from bone cancer
Deaths from cancer in Michigan
American Football League players